Sir Thomas Grosvenor, 3rd Baronet (20 November 1656 – 2 July 1700) was an English Member of Parliament, and an ancestor of the modern day Dukes of Westminster.  He was the first member of the family to build a substantial house on the present site of Eaton Hall in Cheshire.

Early life and education
Grosvenor was born at Eaton Hall, Cheshire, the son of Roger Grosvenor by his wife, Christian (or Christine), daughter of Thomas Myddleton of Chirk Castle, Denbighshire. He was less than five years old when his father, Roger, was killed in a duel with his cousin, Hugh Roberts, on 22 August 1661. Roger had been the son and heir of Sir Richard Grosvenor, 2nd Baronet, and therefore, Thomas succeeded to the baronetcy upon the death of his grandfather on 31 January 1665. He was eight years old at that time.

Grosvenor was educated by a private tutor, who also accompanied him when he undertook the Grand Tour, in his case, a three-year educational tour of France, Italy and the Levant, starting in 1670.  On his return, he set about building a new house at Eaton.  At that time, the family house was a medieval moated house.  The new house was the first substantial one to be built, and it was constructed to the north of the older house.  Grosvenor appointed the architect William Samwell to design it, and building started in 1675.  By 1683, over £1,000 (£ ) had been spent on the hall.  The money for this venture came partly from the estates, and also from coal and lead mines, and from stone quarries in north Wales, that were owned by the family.

Public life
Grosvenor played his part in public life.  In 1677, he was granted the freedom of Chester, and later the same year, he became an alderman.  Two years later, he was returned as a Member of Parliament (MP) for Chester for the first time, in what became known as the Habeas Corpus Parliament; in all, he was to serve in six parliaments.  In 1685, he became Mayor of Chester, and later that year, raised a troop of horses to support James II in the Monmouth Rebellion.  Grosvenor served as Sheriff of Cheshire in 1688–89.

Family
Grosvenor married in 1677; he was aged 21, and his wife, Mary Davies, was only 12 years old. The marriage proved to be harmonious and conventional. Mary was the daughter of Alexander Davies, a scrivener (scribe), and she had inherited substantial land to the west of London. This was part of the Manor of Ebury (previously Eia), and Mary's portion consisted of 'swampy meads' (marshland). The area was later to become the Mayfair, Park Lane, and Belgravia areas of London; the most valuable parts of the Grosvenor Estate.

The couple had three daughters and five sons. Two of the sons, Thomas and Roger, died young; the other three sons all succeeded in turn to the baronetcy, Richard became the 4th Baronet, Thomas the 5th, and Robert the 6th. Two of the daughters, Elizabeth and Mary, also died young. Grosvenor died when Mary was eight months pregnant; she gave birth to a daughter, Ann, within a month.

Mary, Lady Grosvenor, had converted to Roman Catholicism shortly after coming of age. Because of this, and because Eaton Hall was used as a meeting place for Catholics, Grosvenor's loyalty to the king was questioned.  However, he continued openly as an Anglican until his death in 1700, and he was buried in Eccleston church. Grosvenor's surviving sons were all under age at the time of his death; Sir Richard Myddelton, 3rd Baronet, and Thomas and Francis Cholmondeley were appointed as their guardians.

Mary was buried in the churchyard of St. Margaret's Church, Westminster, where in 1892, her tomb was the only one to be seen there, close to the north porch of the church.

References

External links

1656 births
1700 deaths
Baronets in the Baronetage of England
Tory MPs (pre-1834)
High Sheriffs of Cheshire
Thomas Grosvenor, 3rd Baronet
English MPs 1679
English MPs 1680–1681
English MPs 1685–1687
English MPs 1690–1695
English MPs 1695–1698
English MPs 1698–1700
Mayors of Chester